An election to the Neath Rural District Council in West Glamorgan, Wales was held on 11 May 1961. It was preceded by the 1958 election, and followed by the 1964 election.

Overview of the results
Although Labour retained the vast majority of seats, three candidates captured seats previously held by Labour. As at the previous election, over half of the wards saw Labour candidates returned unopposed.

Candidates
The profile of candidates was similar to three years previously with a number of long-serving Labour councillors returned unopposed.

Outcome
Three Independent gains were recorded, including at Bryncoch where Labour lost the seat held by the late J.T. Evans for over forty years. At Coedffranc, Martin Thoms, unsuccessful three years previously, took second place behind long-serving Independent William David. The third Independent victory was at Glyn-neath, where Richard Arthur, a Labour councillor for twelve years until 1958, took a seat from his former party.

Ward results

Baglan Higher (one seat)

Blaengwrach (one seats)

Blaenrhonddan, Bryncoch Ward (one seat)

Blaenrhonddan, Cadoxton Ward (one seat)

Blaenrhonddan, Cilfrew Ward (one seat)

Clyne (one seats)

Coedffranc (five seats)

Dyffryn Clydach (two seats)

Dulais Higher, Crynant Ward (one seat)

Dulais Higher, Onllwyn Ward (one seat)

Dulais Higher, Seven Sisters Ward (two seats)

Dulais Lower (one seat)

Michaelstone Higher (one seat)

Neath Higher (three seats)

Neath Lower (one seat)

Resolven, Cwmgwrach Ward (one seat)

Resolven, Resolven Ward (two seats)

Resolven, Rhigos Ward (two seats)

Resolven, Tonna Ward (one seat)

References

1961 Welsh local elections